Admiral Swinton Colthurst Holland (8 February 1844 – 8 June 1922) was a Royal Navy officer who served as Commodore in Charge at Hong Kong 1896-99, and as Admiral-Superintendent of Chatham dockyard 1899–1902.

Biography
Holland was born in 1844 and, after an initial education at Windlesham House School, joined the Royal Navy in 1857. He was captain of HMS Australia and in charge of the Medway Fleet reserve, before he was appointed Commodore-in-Charge, Hong Kong in 1896. He was promoted to flag rank as rear admiral on 1 January 1899, and in September that year was appointed Admiral-superintendent of Chatham dockyard, serving as such for three years until 2 September 1902.

He retired as admiral in 1908.

Family
Holland married Eva Williams. Among their children were admiral Cedric Swinton Holland (1889–1950).

References

1844 births
1922 deaths
Royal Navy admirals
People educated at Windlesham House School